Lavington Common is a  biological Site of Special Scientific Interest south-west of Petworth in West Sussex. It is a National Trust property.

This site has wet and dry heath, acid grassland and woodland. It has a rich community of invertebrates, especially spiders. Common trees in the woods are silver birch, downy birch and oak, while the shrub layer is dominated by bracken and bramble.

References

Sites of Special Scientific Interest in West Sussex
National Trust properties in West Sussex